The Chama Cha Mapinduzi (CCM) presidential primaries, 2015 took place in July 2015 to determine CCM's nominee for the Presidency of Tanzania for the 2015 election. The Chama Cha Mapinduzi (Party of the Revolution) is the country's dominant ruling party, and the longest reigning ruling party in Africa.

Incumbent president and 2010 nominee Jakaya Kikwete is ineligible for re-election due to term limits. He is looking forward to his retirement, and has described the presidency as being both "stressful and thankless". Kikwete, who also serves as the party's National Chairman, said that he was not backing anyone as his preferred and chosen successor.

More than forty candidates (including 12 Cabinet Members) collected the nomination forms. On 12 July, Minister of Works John Magufuli was selected as the party's presidential nominee, and is most likely to win the presidential election.

Background

Dodoma Six
In February 2014, the CCM's Central Committee summoned and interrogated six prospective candidates at the party's headquarters in Dodoma; and banned them from engaging in premature campaigns for a period of twelve months. They were former Prime Ministers Frederick Sumaye and Edward Lowassa, Foreign Minister Bernard Membe, Minister Stephen Wasira, Deputy Minister January Makamba and former Minister William Ngeleja. The ban was further extended in March 2015, before being lifted on 22 May 2015.

Candidates
The following candidates have been listed according to the dates that they expressed interest or formally announced their candidacy.
 Key

Other candidates

Potential candidates
Anna Tibaijuka, former Lands Minister. Her prospects were diminished when she was sacked by the President after receiving $1 million from a businessman. Tibaijuka denied any wrongdoing and said that she accepted the money as a donation for a school.
Anne Makinda, Speaker
Hussein Mwinyi, Defence Minister

Declined to run
Salim Ahmed Salim, former Prime Minister
 Joseph Warioba, former Prime Minister

Nomination process
The nomination forms cost a non-refundable TSh 1 million (US$500). A total of 42 party members collected the forms from 3 June but only 38 managed to return them by the 2 July deadline. The four disqualified aspirants were Anthony Chalamila, Helena Elinewinga, Muzammil Kalokola and Peter Nyalile. Each candidate was required to solicit sponsorship from at least 450 party members from a minimum of 15 regions (including three regions from Zanzibar). Lowassa's campaign team claims to have gained sponsorship from more than 800,000 party members from all the regions.

The meetings will take place in Dodoma at the party's headquarters and at the newly inaugurated Dodoma Convention Centre. More than 10,000 delegates and their retinues were expected to arrive in the capital.

Central Committee
On 11 July 2015 at 01:20 EAT (UTC +3), the party tweeted the names of the five candidates selected by its Central Committee from the list of 38 aspirants:

National Executive Committee
On 11 July, the National Executive Committee selected the three finalists:

National Congress
The party's National Congress selected Works Minister John Magufuli as the party's 2015 presidential nominee.

Opinion polls

At the party's 8th National Congress in 2012, the following four aspirants were the favourites among the NEC delegates and were elected by them: Wasira (89%), Makamba (87%), Nchemba (84%) and Membe (61%).

References

External links
 CCM Constitution (Kiswahili)

Chama Cha Mapinduzi
Primary elections in Tanzania
2015 elections in Tanzania